Mary Ann Davenport [née Harvey] (1759 – 8 May 1843) was a British Shakespearean actress.

Life
She was born at Launceston, Cornwall. She first appeared on the stage at Bath in December 1784, as Lappet in Henry Fielding's The Miser. After two seasons at Bath she performed in Exeter and Bristol, where in 1786 she married George Gosling Davenport (1758?–1814), a provincial actor. They later worked at the Crow Street Theatre in Dublin, and at Covent Garden. In 1806 she appeared as Lady Denny in Henry VIII (play) with Sarah Siddons as Queen Katherine, John Philip Kemble as Cardinal Wolsey. Her husband’s acting talents were unequal to hers, though he was regarded as a useful member of the company, serving as secretary to the Covent Garden Theatrical Fund until he retired in 1812. After his death, Mary Ann lived in seclusion with her daughter.

In 1817 she appeared again as Lady Denny in Henry VIII when the painting by Benjamin Burnell was created for an exhibition at the Royal Academy of Arts. She retired from the stage on 25 May 1830. 

She died at her house, 17 St Michael's Place, Brompton, London, on 8 May 1843, and was buried at St Paul's, Covent Garden.

References

1759 births
1843 deaths
People from Launceston, Cornwall
English stage actresses
18th-century English actresses
19th-century English actresses